Galanda may refer to:

 Galanda, a genus of moths of the family Noctuidae

Giacomo Galanda (born 1975), Italian professional basket player
Mikuláš Galanda (1895-1938), Slovak painter and illustrator